Smith-Whitford House is a historic home located at New Bern, Craven County, North Carolina.  It was built about 1772, and is a two-story, five bay, central hall plan, Georgian style frame dwelling.  The front entrance was recessed and a shallow porch added during the Late Victorian period.

It was listed on the National Register of Historic Places in 1972.

References

Historic American Buildings Survey in North Carolina
Houses on the National Register of Historic Places in North Carolina
Georgian architecture in North Carolina
Victorian architecture in North Carolina
Houses completed in 1772
Houses in New Bern, North Carolina
National Register of Historic Places in Craven County, North Carolina